Coleocarya is a group of plants in the Restionaceae described as a genus in 1943. There is  only one known species, Coleocarya gracilis, endemic to Australia (New South Wales and southeastern Queensland).

References

Restionaceae
Monotypic Poales genera
Endemic flora of Australia